Javon DeAndre Hargrave (born February 7, 1993) is an American football defensive tackle for the San Francisco 49ers of the National Football League (NFL). He played college football at South Carolina State. He was selected by the Pittsburgh Steelers in the third round of the 2016 NFL Draft.

College career
Hargrave began attending South Carolina State in 2011 where he redshirted as a true freshman. As a redshirt freshman in 2012, he finished with 45 tackles and 4.5 tackles for a loss.

The following season, he collected 12.5 tackles for a loss and 3.5 sacks.

On October 25, 2014, he tied an FCS record after finishing with a total of 6 sacks against Bethune-Cookman. He finished third among the FCS with 16 sacks as a junior in 2014 and was named a First-team All-MEAC.

In the 2015 season opener he made 6 solo tackles, 4.5 tackles for losses, and 2.5 sacks in a 35–7 victory against Arkansas-Pine Bluff. On September 16, 2015, he made 3 tackles and 2.5 tackles for a loss in a 36–0 shutout of Florida A&M. On October 3, 2015, he had a season-high 10 tackles and a sack in a loss to Furman. On October 24, 2015, Hargrave had one of his best games of the season, finishing with 6 solo tackles, 8 total tackles, 4 tackles for losses, forced a fumble, and had a season-high 3 sacks against Delaware State. In Week 11, he again had a season-high 3 sacks, 7 tackles, and 4 tackles for losses in a victory over Norfolk State. In his last career collegiate game he made a total of 4 tackles, 2 sacks, and a forced fumble in a win over Savannah State. He finished his last season with South Carolina State with 45 solo tackles, 59 total tackles, 22 tackles for losses, 13.5 sacks, and 2 forced fumbles. For the second consecutive season he was named a First-team All-MEAC.

Statistics

Professional career
On January 23, 2016, Hargrave participated in the 2016 East–West Shrine Game and raised his draft stock with a good performance. Hargrave was invited to the NFL Scouting Combine and participated in all workouts and positional drills. At South Carolina State's Pro Day, he stood on his combine numbers and only did positional drills. Representatives and scouts from 23 NFL teams attended his Pro Day and four defensive line coaches from the Cincinnati Bengals, Pittsburgh Steelers, Philadelphia Eagles, and Tennessee Titans also came to watch Hargrave, along with 14 other prospects. Although analysts and scouts gave him positive reviews for his motor, playmaking ability, quick footwork, athleticism, and strength they also criticized him for his short arms, stocky frame, small hands, lack of instincts, and also considered him a raw talent. At the conclusion of the pre-draft process, Hargrave was projected by many analysts as a third or fourth round selection. He was ranked as the 11th best defensive tackle prospect in the draft by NFLDraftScout.com.

Pittsburgh Steelers

2016

The Pittsburgh Steelers selected Hargrave in the third round (89th overall) of the 2016 NFL Draft.

On June 10, 2016, the Pittsburgh Steelers signed him to a four-year, $3.114 million rookie contract with a $693,000 signing bonus. Hargrave was the last player of the Steelers' 2016 draft class to sign a contract with the Steelers.

After competing with fellow nose tackle Daniel McCullers in training camp and the preseason, Hargrave won the starting job as the starting nose tackle to begin the 2016 season.

He made his professional regular season debut during Pittsburgh Steelers' season-opener at the Washington Redskins and helped them win 38–16. The following game, Hargrave made his first career start and recorded his first career tackle in a 24-16 victory over the Cincinnati Bengals. On November 20, 2016, Hargrave scored his first career NFL touchdown after Ryan Shazier stripped Cleveland. Browns' quarterback Josh McCown. During the Steelers' victory he recorded his first career sack on McCown and also finished with a tackle. The next game, Hargrave earned a season-high five combined tackles in the Steelers' 28-7 victory over the Indianapolis Colts. On December 4, 2016, he suffered a concussion during a victory over the New York Giants and was inactive the following game against the Buffalo Bills. He finished the  season with 27 combined tackle (18 solo), two sacks, and one touchdown in 13 starts and 15 games.

The Pittsburgh Steelers received a playoff berth after finishing atop the AFC North with an 11–5 record. On January 8, 2017, Hargrave started his first career playoff game and recorded one tackle, as the Steelers routed the Miami Dolphins 30–12 in the AFC Wildcard game. After defeating the Kansas City Chiefs in the divisional round, the Steelers went on to face the New England Patriots in the AFC Championship. Hargrave made five combined tackles as the Steelers lost 17–36 to the eventual Super Bowl LI Champions.

2017
Hargrave returned as the starting nose tackle to start the 2017 season after winning the job over Daniel McCullers and Roy Philon. He started the Pittsburgh Steelers' season-opener against the Cleveland Browns and made three solo tackles and sacked DeShone Kizer in the Steelers' 21–18 victory. On October 8, 2017, Hargrave recorded a career-high ten combined tackles in a 30–9 loss to the Jacksonville Jaguars.

2018
In week 11 against the Jacksonville Jaguars, Hargrave recorded 4 tackles, 2 sacks, and 1 pass defended as the Steelers won 20-16.
Hargrave finished the season with 41 tackles, 6 sacks, and 1 pass defended. He received an overall grade of 82.7 from Pro Football Focus in 2018, which ranked as the 19th highest grade among all qualifying interior defenders.

2019
In week 4 against the Cincinnati Bengals, Hargrave recorded his first sack of the season on Andy Dalton in the 27–3 win. In week 10 against the Los Angeles Rams, Hargrave recorded a strip sack on Jared Goff which was recovered by teammate Minkah Fitzpatrick who returned it for a 43 yard touchdown in the 17–12 win.

Philadelphia Eagles

2020
On March 21, 2020, Hargrave signed a three-year $39 million contract with the Philadelphia Eagles. On August 17, it was reported that Hargrave was dealing with a pectoral injury which ultimately would force him to miss week 1, but he returned the following week and played in the remaining 15 games for the Eagles. In week 14 against the Saints, Hargrave recorded 2 sacks on Taysom Hill and recovered a fumble forced by Josh Sweat in the 24–21 win. He finished the season playing in 15 games, starting 11 of them.

2021
Before the Season, Hargrave changed his jersey number to #97 (the number he wore in college) which became available after the departure of Malik Jackson.

In week 1 of the Eagles season, Hargrave recorded two sacks on Matt Ryan in the 32-6 win against the Falcons. During week 3 against the Cowboys, Hargrave recorded two sacks on Dak Prescott which included a forced fumble in the endzone which was recovered by Fletcher Cox for a touchdown. Hargrave started 16 games, while only missing the final game where all of the Eagles starters were benched. Hargrave had the best season of his career in 2021, as he ended the year with career high totals in sacks (7.5), combined tackles (63), and QB hits (18).

In the Wild Card game against the Buccaneers, Hargrave recorded 4 tackles, 2 QB hits and a sack on Tom Brady in the 31–15 loss. As a result of his breakout campaign, Hargrave was announced as the injury replacement for Kenny Clark in the 2022 Pro Bowl.

2022
In 2022, Hargrave recorded 60 tackles, 11 sacks, 1 forced fumble, and 2 fumble recoveries. Hargrave helped the Eagles reach Super Bowl LVII. In the Super Bowl, Hargrave recorded 5 tackles, but the Eagles lost 38–35 to the Kansas City Chiefs.

San Francisco 49ers
On March 16, 2023, Hargrave signed a four-year, $84 million contract with the San Francisco 49ers.

NFL career statistics

Regular season

Postseason

References

External links
Philadelphia Eagles bio
South Carolina State bio

Living people
1993 births
American football defensive tackles
South Carolina State Bulldogs football players
Players of American football from North Carolina
People from Salisbury, North Carolina
Pittsburgh Steelers players
Philadelphia Eagles players
San Francisco 49ers players